Mai Sơn is a rural district of Sơn La province in the Northwest region of Vietnam. As of 2019, the district had a population of 163,881. The district covers an area of 1,410 km². The district capital lies at Hát Lót.

Administrative divisions
Mai Sơn is divided into 22 commune-level sub-divisions, including the township of Hát Lót and 21 rural communes (Chiềng Ban, Chiềng Chăn, Chiềng Chung, Chiềng Dong, Chiềng Kheo, Chiềng Lương, Chiềng Mai, Chiềng Mung, Chiềng Nơi, Chiềng Sung, Chiềng Ve, Cò Nòi, Hát Lót, Mường Bằng, Mường Bon, Mường Chanh, Nà Bó, Nà Ớt, Phiêng Cằm, Phiêng Pằn, Tà Hộc).

References

Districts of Sơn La province
Sơn La province